Arenophryne is a small genus of Myobatrachid frogs from coastal Western Australia. Common names sandhill frogs and Australian dumpy frogs have been coined for it.

Both species live in sand dune habitat of the Shark Bay region of Western Australia. The two species were initially considered to be just one species, but a genetic analysis found the northern and southern populations to be distinct. Breeding occurs during the wetter winter months where adults call near the surface, and mate underground. The eggs are laid in a burrow and develop directly from eggs to frogs.

Species
There are two species:

References

Myobatrachidae
Amphibian genera
Taxa named by Michael J. Tyler
Amphibians of Australia